The simple-station Calle 72 is part of the TransMilenio mass-transit system of Bogotá, Colombia, opened in the year 2000.

Location

The station is located in northern Bogotá, specifically on Avenida Caracas, between Calles 70A and 72.

History

In 2000, phase one of the TransMilenio system was opened between Portal de la 80 and Tercer Milenio, including this station.

The station is named Calle 72 due to its proximity to the arterial route of the same name.

It serves the demand of the financial district of Calle 72, whose most important building is the Centro Comercial Avenida Chile which is located approximately 350 meters from the station (a Tourist Assistance booth is located at the mall). It also serves the Quinta Camacho, Porciúncula, La Concepción  Norte and San Felipe neighborhoods.

On March 9, 2012, protests lodged by mostly young children in groups of up to 200, blocked in several times and up to 3 hours in the trunk stations Caracas. The protests left destroyed and sacked this season of the system.

Station Services

Old trunk services

Main Line Service

Feeder routes

This station does not have connections to feeder routes.

Inter-city service

This station does not have inter-city service.

External links
TransMilenio
suRumbo.com

See also
Bogotá
TransMilenio
List of TransMilenio Stations

TransMilenio